The 1962 Women's World Chess Championship was won by Nona Gaprindashvili, who beat the reigning champion Elisabeth Bykova in the title match.

1961 Candidates Tournament

The Candidates Tournament was held in Vrnjačka Banja in October–November 1961 and utterly dominated by rising star Gaprindashvili, who went through the event undefeated and finished a full two points ahead of her closest competitor.

{| class="wikitable"
|+ 1961 Women's Candidates Tournament
|-
! !! Player !! 1 !! 2 !! 3 !! 4 !! 5 !! 6 !! 7 !! 8 !! 9 !! 10 !! 11 !! 12 !! 13 !! 14 !! 15 !! 16 !! 17 !! Points !! Tie break
|- style="background:#cfc;"
| 1 ||  || - || 1 || ½ || ½ || 1 || 1 || 1 || 1 || ½ || 1 || 1 || ½ || ½ || ½ || 1 || 1 || 1 || 13 || 
|-
| 2 ||  || 0 || - || 0 || ½ || 1 || 1 || 1 || ½ || 1 || ½ || ½ || ½ || ½ || 1 || 1 || 1 || 1 || 11 || 
|-
| 3 ||  || ½ || 1 || - || ½ || 1 || 0 || 0 || 1 || 0 || ½ || 1 || ½ || 1 || 1 || 0 || 1 || 1 || 10 || 
|-
| 4 ||  || ½ || ½ || ½ || - || 0 || 0 || ½ || ½ || 1 || ½ || ½ || 1 || ½ || ½ || 1 || 1 || 1 || 9½ || 68.00
|-
| 5 ||  || 0 || 0 || 0 || 1 || - || 1 || 0 || ½ || 1 || 1 || 0 || ½ || 1 || 1 || 1 || 1 || ½ || 9½ || 67.75
|-
| 6 ||  || 0 || 0 || 1 || 1 || 0 || - || 1 || 0 || 0 || ½ || 0 || 1 || 1 || 1 || 1 || 1 || 1 || 9½ || 64.00
|-
| 7 ||  || 0 || 0 || 1 || ½ || 1 || 0 || - || 1 || 1 || ½ || ½ || ½ || ½ || 0 || 1 || ½ || 1 || 9 || 66.50
|-
| 8 ||  || 0 || ½ || 0 || ½ || ½ || 1 || 0 || - || 1 || 1 || ½ || 0 || 1 || 1 || 0 || 1 || 1 || 9 || 65.00
|-
| 9 ||  || ½ || 0 || 1 || 0 || 0 || 1 || 0 || 0 || - || 1 || ½ || 1 || 1 || ½ || ½ || 1 || 1 || 9 || 63.25
|-
| 10 ||  || 0 || ½ || ½ || ½ || 0 || ½ || ½ || 0 || 0 || - || 1 || 1 || ½ || 1 || 0 || 1 || 1 || 8 || 
|-
| 11 ||  || 0 || ½ || 0 || ½ || 1 || 1 || ½ || ½ || ½ || 0 || - || ½ || 0 || ½ || ½ || ½ || ½ || 7 || 
|-
| 12 ||  || ½ || ½ || ½ || 0 || ½ || 0 || ½ || 1 || 0 || 0 || ½ || - || 1 || 0 || ½ || 0 || ½ || 6 || 48.75
|-
| 13 ||  || ½ || ½ || 0 || ½ || 0 || 0 || ½ || 0 || 0 || ½ || 1 || 0 || - || 1 || 1 || ½ || 0 || 6 || 46.50
|-
| 14 ||  || ½ || 0 || 0 || ½ || 0 || 0 || 1 || 0 || ½ || 0 || ½ || 1 || 0 || - || 1 || 0 || 1 || 6 || 42.25
|-
| 15 ||  || 0 || 0 || 1 || 0 || 0 || 0 || 0 || 1 || ½ || 1 || ½ || ½ || 0 || 0 || - || 0 || 1 || 5½ || 40.50
|-
| 16 ||  || 0 || 0 || 0 || 0 || 0 || 0 || ½ || 0 || 0 || 0 || ½ || 1 || ½ || 1 || 1 || - || 1 || 5½ || 31.00
|-
| 17 ||  || 0 || 0 || 0 || 0 || ½ || 0 || 0 || 0 || 0 || 0 || ½ || ½ || 1 || 0 || 0 || 0 || - || 2½ || 
|}

1962 Championship Match

The championship match was played in Moscow in 1962. A 21-year-old Gaprindashvili crushed the defending champion Bykova by 9–2, not losing a single game, to become the fifth - and by far youngest - Women's World Champion.

{| class="wikitable" style="text-align:center"
|+Women's World Championship Match 1962
|-
! !! 1 !! 2 !! 3 !! 4 !! 5 !! 6 !! 7 !! 8 !! 9 !! 10 !! 11 !! Total
|-
| align=left | 
| ½ ||style="background:black; color:white"| 0 || 0 ||style="background:black; color:white"| 0 || ½ ||style="background:black; color:white"| 0 || 0 ||style="background:black; color:white"| ½ || ½ ||style="background:black; color:white"| 0 || 0 || 2
|-
| align=left | 
|style="background:black; color:white"| ½ || 1 ||style="background:black; color:white"| 1 || 1 ||style="background:black; color:white"| ½ || 1 ||style="background:black; color:white"| 1 || ½ ||style="background:black; color:white"| ½ || 1 ||style="background:black; color:white"| 1 || 9
|}

References

Women's World Chess Championships
1962 in chess